

Buildings and structures

Buildings
 The first stones are erected at Stonehenge.

References

Architecture